"I Melt with You" is a song by the British new wave band Modern English. The song, produced by Hugh Jones, was the second single from their 1982 album After the Snow. 
It became the band's most successful single, largely in the United States, where it was featured in the film Valley Girl and on MTV. It reached number seven on Billboards Mainstream Rock chart in 1983 and a re-release reached number 76 on its Hot 100 chart in 1990 (after reaching number 78 in 1983).

Background
Modern English formed in 1979 in Colchester, Essex, England. The group signed with 4AD, a British independent record label, in 1980.

The band's vocalist, Robbie Grey, described England at the time of the song's writing to be a bleak place, due to an ongoing economic downturn: "There was no money. There'd be no power—you'd be at home with candles." These conditions and his fears of a nuclear war inspired "I Melt with You". The song depicts a couple making love while an atomic bomb is dropped. In an interview, he described the song as a "love song", but more about the "good and bad in people [...] The last thing we wanted was to write a song where boy meets girl, they go to the cinema and make love, and that's the end of it."

Musically, the song came together in the band's rehearsal space in London while recording their second album, After the Snow. Producer Hugh Jones encouraged Grey to softly sing the vocal track, as opposed to his natural inclination to shout. He subsequently employed a softer vocal technique on the rest of the album.

The original 4:11 album version features no call-and-response vocals in the second verse, and features a synthesizer break that begins at the second chorus. The more commonly known version of the song is the 3:50 single mix, in which the synthesizer riff is audible during the first chorus, an octave lower than on subsequent choruses, along with contrasting background vocals in the second verse - "You should know better" sung before "Dream of better lives...," etc. Eight bars from the instrumental break after the second chorus are cut in the single version, such that only the second rendering of the line "the future's...open wide" (lyrics sung twice on the album version) is present and the guitar riff leading up to this line thus fades in a bit more abruptly, accounting for the time difference between the album and single versions.  The latter version was mixed down to mono from its original stereo recording. While both the album and single versions have circulated on radio, the true stereo mix of the single version has rarely been available since.

Commercial performance
The song was released in the United Kingdom, in May 1982, by label 4AD. The song was mainly a success in the United States, gaining attention over a long incubation period before becoming Modern English's and 4AD's first chart hit. It first began receiving radio airplay as an import single, and bounced from station to station, gaining momentum. In April 1983, the song peaked at number 7 on the US Billboard Mainstream Rock chart and number 78 on the main Billboard Hot 100. "I Melt with You" was particularly popular in dance clubs and on MTV, peaking  at number 60 on Billboard Dance/Disco Top 80 in March 1983. The single's success drastically altered the band's experience, according to Grey: "Someone picked up an import from England and started playing it on mainstream radio in America, and it just went like wildfire. We used to play to 200 people in art college; the next thing we knew, we were in Daytona Beach playing to 5,000 people who knew all the words [to the song]."

Modern English re-recorded the song for their 1990 album Pillow Lips. The song re-appeared on the Hot 100, peaking at number 76 in July, and re-appeared on the Dance charts, peaking at number 25 in August. The reformed original line up of the band re-recorded it again in 2010 in a completely reworked style for inclusion in the movie I Melt With You.

The song is among the top 500 songs ever played on U.S. radio. The group received a lifetime achievement award at the BMI Awards in 2017, celebrating 3 million plays of the song. It is ranked #39 on VH1's 100 Greatest Songs of the 80s. As Modern English's only major hit song, they are generally considered one-hit wonders, despite not reaching the Top 40 of the U.S. Hot 100 during either of its runs on that chart. It was ranked #7 on VH1's 100 Greatest One Hit Wonders of the 80s.

Reception
A reviewer for Billboard commended the song as "classy", describing it as a "dreamy, acoustic-edged rocker." The re-recorded edition of the song for the band's 1990 album Pillow Lips was received negatively by the Los Angeles Times Chris Willman, who dubbed it "nearly identical yet markedly inferior."

The song has remained popular over the years. Tom Demalon AllMusic called it "one of the most enduring songs of the new wave era." Los Angeles Times contributor Sara Scriber wrote in 1997 that the song endured because it "struck a chord for its gothic, escapist undercurrent and danceable rhythm." In 2017, Chrissie Dickinson of the Chicago Tribune wrote that "with its irresistible guitar melody, danceable beat and heartfelt call and response vocals, it was a piece of work that fit snugly into the era."

In popular culture and cover versions
"I Melt with You" has been covered by a variety of artists, with several different versions being licensed for film and television worldwide including the film Not Another Teen Movie (where a version by Mest is played). Modern English's original version was largely popularized by its appearance in the 1983 film Valley Girl, in which it features in both the ending titles and in a "falling in love" montage sequence. In 2002 the song featured in video game Grand Theft Auto: Vice City in the other in-game music. A cover by American singer-songwriter Jason Mraz was included on the soundtrack to the 2004 film 50 First Dates. French group Nouvelle Vague's rendition found placement in Mr. and Mrs. Smith (2005). Australian singer Natalie Imbruglia covered the song for her studio album Male in 2015. American rock band Bowling for Soup covered the song as part of the soundtrack to the 2005 Disney film Sky High and the trailer for Ice Age: The Meltdown. The song was covered by the cast of Glee in the 2014 episode "Old Dog, New Tricks". It was also featured in an episode of the Netflix series Stranger Things in 2016. In the final season of The Deuce, it was featured in the opening scene of episode one, which aired on September 9, 2019.

In 2021 it was sung by Jane Levy in the Season Two series finale titled "Zoey's Extraordinary Goodbye," of Zoey's Extraordinary Playlist. In 2014, "I Melt with You" was featured in season 2, episode 4 of the television show The Americans.

Charts

Certifications

References

Footnotes

Sources

External links
 

1982 songs
1982 singles
1983 singles
1990 singles
4AD singles
Modern English (band) songs
Bowling for Soup songs
Sire Records singles
Song recordings produced by Hugh Jones (producer)
Songs about nuclear war and weapons
TVT Records singles